Baljit Singh s/o Sarjab Singh (born 15 January 1987) is a field hockey player from Kluang, Johor, Malaysia. Baljit is the 2008 top scorer in the Malaysia Hockey League with 13 goals. 

He has also been the top scorer in the Malaysian Junior Hockey League for Bukit Jalil Sports School (BJSS) in 2004 with 13 goals, 2005 with 28 goals and 2006 with 23 goals. He featured in the 2007 Asia Cup in Chennai in August and scored three penalty corner goals.

In 2011, Baljit had a stint with Singh Sabha Sports Club in Hong Kong. He scored 3 goals in Hong Kong Premier Division.

References

1987 births
Living people
Malaysian Sikhs
Malaysian sportspeople of Indian descent
Malaysian people of Punjabi descent
People from Johor
Malaysian male field hockey players
Southeast Asian Games gold medalists for Malaysia
Southeast Asian Games medalists in field hockey
Competitors at the 2007 Southeast Asian Games